Constantin "Titi" Dumitrescu (born 14 March 1931) is a retired light-welterweight boxer from  Romania. He won five consecutive national titles in 1955–1959 and a bronze medal at the 1956 Olympics.

Dumitrescu took up boxing in 1946 under the guidance of his father George Dumitrescu. He announced his retirement right after winning his last national title in 1959. On the next day he was hired as a boxing coach and kept that job until 1985, raising 80 national champions.

References

External links 

 
 
 

1931 births
Olympic boxers of Romania
Olympic bronze medalists for Romania
Boxers at the 1956 Summer Olympics
Living people
Olympic medalists in boxing
Romanian male boxers
Medalists at the 1956 Summer Olympics
Light-welterweight boxers